The indigenous peoples of Western New Guinea in Indonesia and Papua New Guinea, commonly called Papuans, are Melanesians. There is genetic evidence for two major historical lineages in New Guinea and neighboring islands: a first wave from the Malay Archipelago perhaps 50,000 years ago when New Guinea and Australia were a single landmass called Sahuland, much later, a wave of Austronesian people from the north who introduced Austronesian languages and pigs about 3,500 years ago. They also left a small but significant genetic trace in many coastal Papuan peoples. 

Linguistically, Papuans speak languages from the many families of non-Austronesian languages that are found only on New Guinea and neighboring islands, as well as Austronesian languages along parts of the coast, and recently developed creoles such as Tok Pisin, Hiri Motu, Unserdeutsch, and Papuan Malay.

The term "Papuan" is used in a wider sense in linguistics and anthropology. In linguistics, "Papuan languages" is a cover term for the diverse, mutually unrelated, non-Austronesian language families spoken in Melanesia, the Torres Strait Islands, and parts of Wallacea. In anthropology, "Papuan" is often used to denote the highly diverse aboriginal populations of Melanesia and Wallacea prior to the arrival of Austronesian-speakers, and the dominant genetic traces of these populations in the current ethnic groups of these areas.

Languages

Ethnologues 14th edition lists 826 languages of Papua New Guinea and 257 languages of Western New Guinea, a total of 1083 languages, with 12 languages overlapping. They can be divided into two groups, the Austronesian languages, and all the others, called Papuan languages for convenience. The term Papuan languages refers to an areal grouping, rather than a linguistic one. So-called Papuan languages comprise hundreds of different languages, most of which are not related.

Papuan ethnic groups

The following indigenous peoples live within the modern borders of Indonesia and Papua New Guinea. Austronesian-speaking (AN) groups are given in italics.

Indonesia

West Papua

Papuan ethnic groups / tribes in Indonesian province of West Papua include Abun, Ambel, Arfak, Awe, Ayamaru, Ayfat, Batanta, Biak, Biga, Bira, Borai, Butlih, Domu, Doreri, Emeyode, Fiawat, Hatam, Irarutu, Irires, Iwaro, Kais, Kawe, Koiwai, Kuri, Langanyan, Madekwana, Mairasi, Maniwak, Matbat, Mbaham, Matta, Meiah, Meybrat, Miere, Miyah, Moi, Moire, Moru, Moskona, Mpur, Napiti, Nerigo, Oburauw, Roon, Roswar, Sebyar, Sougb, Soviar, Sumuri, Tehit, Tepin, Wamesa, Warumba, Waruri, Wawiyai, Wondama, Yaban, Konda.

Papua
Papuan ethnic groups/tribes in Indonesian province of Papua include:

Highland Papua
Papuan ethnic groups/tribes in Indonesian province of Highland Papua include:

Central Papua
Papuan ethnic groups/tribes in Indonesian province of Central Papua include:

South Papua
Papuan ethnic groups/tribes in Indonesian province of South Papua include:

Papua New Guinea

 Abelam
 Angu
 Baruya
 Biangai
 Bilibil
 Chambri
 Duna
 Etoro
 Fore
 Gadsup
 Gogodala
 Haroli
 Hewa
 Huli
 Iatmul
 Kaluli
 Kwoma
 Koteka
 Maisin (AN with many non-AN elements)
 Melpa
 Mian
 Morkai
 Motu
 Min
 Mundugumor
 Ogea
 Orokaiva
 Sambia
 Swagap
 Tairora
 Tanga
 Telefol
 Tsembaga
 Urapmin
 Wiru
 Wola
 Wopkaimin
 Yaifo
 Zia

Bismarck Archipelago

 Baining
 Tolai
 Trobriand

Origin and genetics
In a 2005 study of ASPM gene variants, Mekel-Bobrov et al. found that the Papuan people have among the highest rate of the newly evolved ASPM HaplogroupD, at 59.4% occurrence of the approximately 6,000-year-old allele. While it is not yet known exactly what selective advantage is provided by this gene variant, the haplogroupD allele is thought to be positively selected in populations and to confer some substantial advantage that has caused its frequency to rapidly increase.

Main Y-DNA Haplogroups of Papuan people are HaplogroupMS, HaplogroupP and HaplogroupC1b2a; a significant minority belong also to Haplogroup O-M175.

Based on his genetic studies of the Denisova hominin, an ancient human species discovered in 2010, Svante Pääbo claims that ancient human ancestors of the Papuans interbred in Asia with these humans. He has found that people of New Guinea share 4%–7% of their genome with the Denisovans, indicating this exchange. 

Phylogenetic data suggests that an early Eastern Eurasian or "eastern non-African" (ENA) meta-population trifurcated, and gave rise to the Australo-Papuans, the Andamanese Onge / AASI, as well as East/Southeast Asians, although Australo-Papuans may have also received some gene flow from an earlier group (xOoA), around 2%, next to additional archaic admixture in the Sahul region. 

According to one study, Australo-Papuans (such as the indigenous people of New Guinea and Aboriginal Australians) could have either formed from a mixture between an East Asian lineage and lineage basal to West and East Asians, or as a sister lineage of East Asians with or without a minor basal OoA or xOoA contribution.

A 2016 study at the University of Cambridge by Christopher Klein et al. suggests that it was about 50,000 years ago that these peoples reached Sahul (the supercontinent consisting of present-day Australia and its islands and New Guinea). The sea levels rose and isolated New Guinea about 10,000 years ago, but Aboriginal Australians and Papuans diverged from each other genetically earlier, about 37,000 years BP.

Notable people

 Abba Bina, Papua New Guinean businessman and politician
 Archie Thompson, former Australian soccer player
 Elie Aiboy, former Indonesian footballer
 Marlina Flassy, Indonesian anthropologist and the first woman to be appointed Dean of Cenderawasih University
 Frans Kaisiepo, 4th Governor of Papua and National Hero of Indonesia
 Nitya Krishinda Maheswari, Indonesian badminton player and 2014 Asian Games women's doubles gold medalist
 Nowela Auparay, professional singer and Indonesian Idol winner
 Peter O'Neill, 7th Prime Minister of Papua New Guinea
 Freddy Numberi, Indonesian politician and former Minister of Transportation
 Raema Lisa Rumbewas, Indonesian weightlifter and silver medallist at the 2000 and 2004 Summer Olympics
 Boaz Solossa, Indonesian footballer
 Titus Bonai, Indonesian footballer
 Ricky Kambuaya, Indonesian footballer
 Michael Somare, former Prime Minister of Papua New Guinea
 Heather Watson, English female tennis player

See also

 Aboriginal Australians
 Indigenous Australians
 Koteka Tribal Assembly
 List of ethnic groups of West Papua
 Moluccans (to the west of New Guinea)
 Negrito (Southeast Asia)
 Papua conflict
 Proto-Australoid
 Stéphane Breton (filmmaker)
 Torres Strait Islanders between New Guinea and mainland Australia (including the Meriam people, whose language family is otherwise found in New Guinea)

References

Further reading

External links
 

Papuan people